William Raymond Healy (March 28, 1924 – September 22, 2010) was an All-American college football player for the Georgia Tech Yellow Jackets. He graduated from Baylor School in 1942 and served in the 88th Cavalry reconnaissance squadron in the European Theater during World War II. He was awarded the Silver Star and the Bronze Star for gallantry in action. At Georgia Tech, he was a five-sport letterman. 
He was a member of the Chattanooga Sports Hall of Fame, Georgia Tech Hall of Fame and the Georgia Sports Hall of Fame. Healy was selected by the Associated Press for an all-time SEC team in 1950.

References

1924 births
2010 deaths
All-American college football players
American football guards
Georgia Tech Yellow Jackets football players
Sportspeople from New Brunswick, New Jersey
United States Army personnel of World War II